Zinc Football, also known as Zinc Football Academy, is an Indian professional football academy club based in Zawar, a mining town in Udaipur, Rajasthan. The club competes in R-League A Division, the top tier league of the state. The academy was formed in 2017 as part of Hindustan Zinc Limited major stake holder Vedanta Resources's CSR. Zinc FA is the current champions of R-League, and was nominated for I-League Second Division.

Players

Affiliated clubs 
The following clubs are currently affiliated with Zinc FA

  Sesa Football Academy (2018–present)

Honours

League
 R-League A Division
Champions (1): 2021

Cup
Hot Weather Football Championship
Runners-up (1): 2022

Youth team
Club's U17 team competes in various nationwide tournaments including the Hero Youth League.

Honours
Elite Youth Cup Ahmedabad
Champions (1): 2022
All India U17 Administrator's Challenge Cup
Third place (1): 2022

See also
 List of football clubs in India

References 

Football clubs in Rajasthan
Association football clubs established in 2017
2017 establishments in Rajasthan